Ephraim Silas Obot (October 6, 1936 – April 12, 2009) was the Nigeria bishop of the Roman Catholic Diocese of Idah on Nigeria from his appointment on December 17, 1977, until his death in 2009.

Obot was first ordained as a Roman Catholic priest on June 29, 1968, Ikot Ekpene, Nigeria. He died on April 12, 2009, at the age of 72.

Sources
Catholic Bishops Conference of Nigeria: Bishop Obot dies at 72
Catholic Hierarchy: Bishop Ephraim Silas Obot †

1936 births
2009 deaths
20th-century Roman Catholic bishops in Nigeria
Roman Catholic bishops of Idah